Why Are You OK is the fifth studio album by indie rock band Band of Horses, released on June 10, 2016 on Interscope. Produced by Jason Lytle, of the band Grandaddy, the album was preceded by the singles "Casual Party", "In A Drawer" and "Solemn Oath". It is the band's last album with guitarist Tyler Ramsey and bassist Bill Reynolds, who left the group in 2017.

Critical reception

The album received a score of 71 out of 100 on review aggregator website Metacritic, indicating "generally favorable" reviews from critics.

Accolades

Track listing

Charts

References

2016 albums
Band of Horses albums
Interscope Records albums